Susan Seidelman (Born December 11, 1952) is an American film director, producer, and writer.  She first came to notice with Smithereens (1982), the earliest American independent feature to be screened in Competition at the Cannes Film Festival. Her next feature, Desperately Seeking Susan (1985), co-starred Madonna in her first film, and was named as one of 100 greatest films directed by women by BBC; it resulted in a Cesar Award nomination. She-Devil (1989) starred Meryl Streep in her first starring comedic film role and Roseanne Barr in her first feature-film role. Her work on the short film The Dutch Master resulted in an Academy Award nomination. Seidelman's subsequent films mix comedy with drama, blending genres and pop-cultural references with a focus on women protagonists, particularly outsiders. She also works in television and directed the pilot episode of Sex and the City.

Early life and education
Seidelman was born on December 11, 1952  in Abington, Pennsylvania and raised in a suburb of Philadelphia, the oldest daughter of a hardware manufacturer and a teacher.  She graduated from Abington Senior High School in 1969, and studied fashion and arts at Drexel University in Philadelphia. After taking a film appreciation class where she was inspired by the French New Wave, particularly the films of Jean-Luc Godard and François Truffaut, as well as Ingmar Bergman, she switched her focus to filmmaking.

Her first foray into movie-making at New York University resulted in a Student Academy Award Nomination for her satirical short film about a housewife's affair, And You Act Like One Too.

Seidelman earned an MFA from NYU's Tisch School of the Arts and is an adjunct professor in the school's film department, overseeing students' thesis films.

Career

Early 1980s
Seidelman made her feature-film debut with Smithereens (1982), a bleak and darkly humorous look at New York City's downtown Bohemian scene of the 1980s. It was shot on 16mm for $40,000 on location, at times "guerrilla style" on the streets and in the subways of New York. Smithereens captured the look of the post-punk music scene and was the first American independent film to be selected for competition at the Cannes Film Festival. With recognition from Cannes, Seidelman became a member of the first wave of 80s-era independent filmmakers in the American cinema.

1985–1999
Seidelman's second theatrical film Desperately Seeking Susan (1985), featuring then-rising star Madonna, was a major box-office and critical success, launching the careers of co-stars Rosanna Arquette and Aidan Quinn and introducing a new generation of actors and performers such as John Turturro, Laurie Metcalf, Robert Joy, Mark Blum, Giancarlo Esposito, and comedian Steven Wright. Seidelman encouraged her producers to cast Madonna, who was a neighbor of hers with no acting experience, believing she would lend downtown authenticity and charisma to the role.

Seidelman's subsequent movies of the 1980s were Making Mr. Right (1987), a romantic sci-fi comedy starring Ann Magnuson and John Malkovich, who played dual roles as both a socially awkward scientist and his lovesick android creation; Cookie (1989), a father-daughter mafia comedy starring Peter Falk, Dianne Wiest, and Emily Lloyd, written by Nora Ephron and Alice Arlen; and She-Devil (also 1989), the film version of Fay Weldon's bestselling novel, with Meryl Streep in her first comedic movie role and Roseanne Barr in her first feature-film role.

In 1994, Seidelman and screenwriter Jonathan Brett received an Academy Award nomination for a short film they co-wrote and co-produced called The Dutch Master. The film was part of the series "Erotic Tales" produced by Regina Ziegler and was screened at both the Cannes Film Festival and Telluride Film Festival. In the same year Seidelman was a member of the jury at the 44th Berlin International Film Festival.

2000–present
Seidelman returned to feature films with Gaudi Afternoon (2001), a gender-bending detective story set in Barcelona, starring Judy Davis, Marcia Gay Harden, Juliette Lewis and Lili Taylor. The screenplay by James Myhre was based on the book Gaudi Afternoon: A Cassandra Reilly Mystery by Barbara Wilson.

Her film Boynton Beach Club (2005) was based on an original idea by her mother, Florence Seidelman, who while living in South Florida had gathered true stories of senior citizens who were suddenly back in the "dating game" after the loss of a spouse. It's one of the first movies to deal with sexuality and the aging Baby Boomer generation and had a theatrical run and acclaim at U.S. film festivals. The ensemble cast featured studio veterans Brenda Vaccaro, Dyan Cannon, Sally Kellerman, Joseph Bologna, Michael Nouri and Len Cariou.

Seidelman's next film Musical Chairs (2011) opened in limited release. The story is set in the South Bronx and Manhattan and revolves around a couple taking part in a wheelchair ballroom dancing competition after the woman becomes disabled. The film had its premiere at Lincoln Center's Dance on Camera Festival and played at the New York International Latino Film Festival, the Miami International Film Festival, and the Havana International Film Festival, among others.

Seidelman's film The Hot Flashes (2013) is about middle-aged women living in small-town Texas, all former 1980s basketball champs, reuniting to challenge the current girls' high school team to raise funds for a breast-cancer treatment center. It starred Brooke Shields, Daryl Hannah, Wanda Sykes, Virginia Madsen, Camryn Manheim, and Eric Roberts.

Television
In the 1990s and 2000s Seidelman garnered success as a television director, helming the pilot of Sex and the City, which involved some casting and developing the look and feel of the show. Seidelman thought the pilot script by Darren Star was bold, presenting then-taboo subject matter with humor, saying, "It was the first time that a TV show featured women talking about things they really talk about in private." She directed subsequent episodes during the show's first season.

Seidelman has two Emmy nominations for the Showtime film A Cooler Climate, starring Sally Field and Judy Davis and written by Pulitzer Prize-winner Marsha Norman. She has also directed episodes of Comedy Central's cult hit Stella and PBS's The Electric Company.

Influences
Seidelman was inspired early on by European film directors Lina Wertmüller and Agnès Varda, whose work she studied in college during the 1970s—a time when there were very few female directors active in the American film industry. The feminist movement of the 60s and 70s, as well as the personal filmmaking style of the French New Wave, and directors Jean-Luc Godard, François Truffaut, and John Cassavetes were also early influences. Seidelman is a fan of Billy Wilder for his social observation, drama, and humor.

Nora Ephron, with whom she collaborated on Cookie, was seen as a role model by Seidelman, as a woman writer and director able to combine family life with a successful film career. Among contemporaries, Seidelman notes the cerebral stories of the Coen Brothers, mid-career Woody Allen, early Martin Scorsese, and the films of Jane Campion are all favorites. She has said she is drawn to directors with distinct, slightly "outsider" points of view.

On her frequent blending of comedy with drama, Seidelman says, "If I wasn’t a filmmaker I probably would’ve liked to be a cultural anthropologist or sociologist since I’m interested in human behavior. I like mixing comedy [with drama] because life is serious and humorous. . . . there's got to be something underneath the humor. I like using humor as a way of making observations about how we live and what makes us human."

Themes
Altering the formulas of traditional film genres, Seidelman explores issues of identity for women of varying ages and backgrounds.

Updated film genres
Seidelman spins established film genres, updating them by focusing on female protagonists, society's outsiders and gender roles.

In Smithereens, set in the early 1980s, the trope of the plucky heroine trying to make it in the music world is upended by teenaged Wren's goal to become famous despite having no applicable creative talents. Plastering fliers of her face around the city, Wren's a precursor of the "famous for being famous" personalities of the Internet age. Seidelman says that Wren's story "is about something broader: the fragmented nature of life in the 80's. It could have taken place in other settings."

Desperately Seeking Susan is a screwball comedy inspired by Jacques Rivette's Celine and Julie Go Boating, that explores identity-swapping among its two protagonists, Roberta and Susan. Instead of a conventional male/female role-swap, bored suburbanite Roberta trades personas with adventuresome Susan, and by doing so, recognizes her inner desires, both romantic and artistic.

In Cookie, a mafia story, the primary focus is on the relationships between single mother, Lenore, her teenage daughter Cookie, and absentee crime-boss father, Dino, along with his wife, Bunny, reunited when he's released from prison. In Dino's absence, the women have learned to survive on their own and profane, independent Cookie supplies the solution to Dino's desire to go straight—resulting in a feminist family comic-drama within a gangster story.

Based on true stories set in an insular Florida community, Boynton Beach Clubs romantic leads are all past retirement age. The members of a bereavement group experience classic romantic-comedy scenarios—awkward first dates, sexual insecurity, miscommunication and misunderstandings—after losing longtime partners. Seidelman had not seen older baby boomers dealing with loss, grief and romance in films and set out to create modern seniors without stereotyping.

Further genre mixing is evident in Making Mr Right, which combines sci-fi with romance among an android, his maker, and a successful career woman whose job is to teach the android about emotions. Gaudi Afternoon blends the detective mystery with family drama. The Hot Flashes is an against-all-odds sports film with middle-aged underdogs going up against youthful champions.

Identity and self-actualization
Appearances and what they reveal and conceal is a recurring theme in Seidelman's films, along with how women rebel against or create a place for themselves within society's expectations.

Roberta in Desperately Seeking Susan takes on Susan's mysterious and troublesome identity when she wears her clothes. Devoid of her usual suburban-housewife wardrobe and suffering from amnesia, Roberta embarks on an urban adventure by "trying on" the free-spirited persona of Susan. Susan, in search of Roberta, lives in her large house for 24 hours, trashing it, but appreciating the luxury and comfort therein.

She-Devil is a revenge comedy/satire that pits homely abandoned wife Ruth against beautiful wealthy romance-novelist Mary. By taking revenge on her husband, Ruth finds power utilizing her skills as a formerly unpaid homemaker, and obtains success by employing other women in the same predicament. Mary, in contrast, saddled with Ruth's children, discovers how difficult maintaining a household can be – at odds with the tropes of romance-fiction.

Aspects of sexual identity and parenthood are explored in Gaudi Afternoon, set in Barcelona, Spain, where translator Cassandra, middle-aged, purposefully single, with no desire for children, finds herself enmeshed in a family squabble among a pansexual group of San Francisco transplants.

Pop culture, performance and transformation
Seidelman's early studies in fashion have influenced her art direction, costumes and overall style as visual story elements in her films.

Fashion and reflective colors make downtown New York of the 80s a stylized East Village wonderland for Roberta in Desperately Seeking Susan. In contrast, her suburban home is presented in cool pastels and hard edges—an atmosphere where social mores and false fronts are more rigidly enforced. Performing as a magician's assistant, where costume and artifice is a requirement, she hones her survival skills that lead to personal satisfaction on and off the stage.

Smithereens explored the same colorful downtown scene, but with more grit and squalor, reflecting its low-budget independent production. Wren has more desire than creative skill, but like Giulietta Masina's character in Fellini's Nights of Cabiria, whom Seidelman notes as an inspiration, she's a survivor and her wish for recognition within the local punk-rock scene is presented without judgment.

A magic club is also a feature of Gaudí Afternoon where asexual Cassandra, through her attraction to openly bisexual Hamilton—an amateur magician—acknowledges her own sexual awareness. Antoni Gaudí's eccentric, sensual architecture is the scenic backdrop to Cassandra's deeper involvement with an alternative family and their young daughter, which ultimately brings about change in her personal life.

A diverse cast of dancers perform in Musical Chairs, where Armando and Mia's relationship develops within the world of competitive wheelchair ballroom dancing—a dance form popular in Europe and Asia, but mostly unknown in the U.S. The dance troupe, outsiders in the world of feature-film, include a transgender woman and an Iraqi veteran, highlighting dance as a form of self-expression available to everyone. Laverne Cox, who is transgender, has said that playing Chantelle, a disabled African American transgender woman, in a feature film was a career milestone.

Personal life
Seidelman is married to screenwriter and producer Jonathan Brett. , she lives in the "New Jersey countryside, to which she and her husband recently moved after several decades in downtown New York". Their son Ozzy is a producer and video editor.

Awards and nominations

Filmography

Films

Television

References

External links

Literature on Susan Seidelman
The Dutch Master on IMDb

Living people
Film producers from Pennsylvania
Screenwriters from Pennsylvania
American television directors
Drexel University alumni
American women film directors
American women television directors
New York University alumni
People from Montgomery County, Pennsylvania
Writers from Philadelphia
American women screenwriters
Film directors from Pennsylvania
20th-century American actresses
American film actresses
American women film producers
21st-century American women
20th-century American Jews
21st-century American Jews
1952 births
Women in punk